Großstadtrevier (roughly (Big) City Police Station) is a German television series, broadcast on Germany's Das Erste of the ARD. First aired on 16 December 1986, the show is one of the most popular television series in the country. It follows the everyday work of a fictional police station on the Kiez of Hamburg.

Episodes

Season 1 (1986-87)

See also
List of German television series

External links
 

1986 German television series debuts
Television shows set in Hamburg
German crime television series
1980s German police procedural television series
1990s German police procedural television series
2000s German police procedural television series
2010s German police procedural television series
2020s German police procedural television series
1990s German television series
2000s German television series
2010s German television series
German-language television shows
Das Erste original programming